Fix Me is the debut studio album by Canadian rock band Marianas Trench, released on October 3, 2006.

Background
On January 8, 2003, it was announced the band had signed to Nickelback frontman Chad Kroeger's 604 Records label. The album reflects the drug addiction struggle of lead vocalist Josh Ramsay.

The album was engineered and mixed by Mike Fraser.

It contains the single "Say Anything" as well as "Decided to Break It" and "Shake Tramp", all of which had music videos made to promote the singles. Fix Me failed to enter the Canadian Albums Chart, however the album still sold 35,000 copies in Canada.

Critical reception

Fix Me was received with generally positive reviews. Matthew Chisling of AllMusic gave the album a 3 star rating stating, " their first album is more generic and radio-ready than its follow-ups, which are often quirky and catchy." Alternative Addiction calls the album, "an original blend of raw hard rock, pop and punk with the odd twist for good measure."

Track listing

Personnel
Credits for Fix Me adapted from AllMusic.

Marianas Trench
 Josh Ramsay - lead vocals, guitar, piano, production
 Matt Webb - guitar, vocals, piano, production
 Mike Ayley - bass guitar, vocals, production
 Ian Casselman - drums, percussion, vocals, production

Production
 Rebecca Blissett - cover photo
 Mike Cashin - assistant engineer
 Mike Fraser – mixing
 Dave Genn - engineer, keyboard programming, producer, string arrangements
 Laura Hasthorpe - viola
 George Marino - mastering
 Mark Maryanovich - layout design, photography
 Jonathan Simkin - A&R
 John Stamos - guitar technician
 Scott Ternan - engineer
 Sheldon Zaharko - string engineer

Certifications

Awards and nominations

|-
| 2007 || "Shake Tramp" || SOCAN No.1 song award || 
|-
| 2008 || "Marianas Trench" || Canadian Radio Music Awards"Best New group or solo artist of the year" || 
|-
|  || "Shake Tramp" || Juno Video of the Year || 
|-

Marianas Trench EP

Marianas Trench is the first extended play recorded by Marianas Trench. All eight tracks were eventually re-released in studio recordings — "Decided to Break It", "Push", "Far From Here", and "Push You Up" (re-recorded under the title "Skin & Bones") were all re-recorded for their debut studio album, Fix Me (2006); "Fix Me" and "Feeling Small" were released as standalone B-side promotional singles on iTunes in 2007 and 2009, respectively; and "Primetime and "Sicker Things" were released alongside two then-new song as the Something Old / Something New EP in 2015.

Track listing
 All songs written and composed by Josh Ramsay.
"Primetime"
"Decided to Break It"
"Push You Up" (Re-recorded later on as 'Skin & Bones' from Fix Me (2006) )
"Far From Here"
"Sicker Things"
"Feeling Small"
"Fix Me"
"Push"

Singles

Say Anything
"Say Anything" is the debut single by Marianas Trench from their album Fix Me. It was released in July 2006 as a limited edition demo EP. It peaked at #3 in Canada on the Canadian Singles Chart.

Music video
The video opens with the band playing alone in a small room. As the video progresses it is clear that somebody is stalking the band. Bassist Mike Ayley films himself dancing in his room. Unknown to Ayley, the footage is stolen. Guitarist Matt Webb models for his own cameras and the pictures are stolen. Drummer Ian Cassleman hosts a tea party with a collection of stuffed animals. The stalker hides in a pile of plushies and takes pictures. All stolen footage is published. At the end of the video, lead singer Josh Ramsay slides down a railing outside a hotel, dropping his suitcase, and spilling the footage of the other band members and revealing that Ramsay was the stalker. At the very end newspaper headlines can be seen, reading "Singer Sells Out Bandmates", "Marianas Trench Fire Lead Singer", and "Josh: 'I'm Sorry'. Begs Marianas to Take Him Back. Will it Work?"

Charts

Decided to Break it
"Decided to Break It" is the second single of Marianas Trench's debut album Fix Me. It was released as a single in 2006 as a follow up to "Say Anything". A music video was filmed for the single in which the band along with three out-of-shape "coaches" train for a race against rival team Spider Pirates.

The song was used in an episode of the Canadian drama Degrassi: the Next Generation.

Charts

Shake Tramp
"Shake Tramp" is a song by Marianas Trench released as the third single from their debut album Fix Me. The song reached #65 on the Canadian Singles Chart and the #1 spot on the MuchMusic Countdown of Friday, August 10, 2007. The song was also featured on an episode of Video on Trial.

Music video
The music video for "Shake Tramp" begins with a montage of all the members of the band singing the beginning harmonies. The camera focus is then directed to lead singer Josh Ramsay walking down a street (filmed in Burnaby Village Museum, Burnaby, B.C.) set in the early 20th century. He interacts and socializes with the people, all of whom appear to love him. This section ends with Ramsay accidentally getting hit in the face by a man (Biji) carrying a ladder. He collapses and blacks out.
When he wakes up Ramsay is on the same street, but in current time. He is still dancing and trying to interact with the same people, however this time they treat him harshly. A woman he danced with in the last segment, sprays him in the eyes with pepper spray. As he walks around the town, more people begin to insult him until he finally arrives in an outdoor mosh. The rest of the band (Matt, Mike and Ian) are playing here, and as he joins them for the last chorus. Their music is received well and the townspeople are dancing along. It appears to go back to the time period used in the beginning of the video, with the exception of the members of the band who are dressed in modern apparel. There are many choreographed dance sequences performed by Ramsay throughout the video which he stated he had to take 2 months of dance instruction to prepare for.

Charts

References

2006 albums
604 Records albums
Albums recorded at The Warehouse Studio
Marianas Trench (band) albums